Vrooom Vroom Vroooom is a fantasy short film directed by Melvin Van Peebles. First released in 1995, it was featured as a part of the anthology film Tales of Erotica the following year.

Premise 
Leroy, a misfit boy, saves an elderly woman with voodoo powers from being run over by a bus, and receives a motorcycle. While riding it at night, the motorcycle transforms into an attractive woman.

External links

1995 films
1995 short films
1990s erotic films
Films directed by Melvin Van Peebles
German short films
1990s English-language films